Nikodim II was the Serbian Patriarch in the period of 1445–1455.

As the hegumen of the Studenica monastery, Nikodim was appointed the Metropolitan of Raška sometime prior to 1439. Serbian ruler, despot Đurađ Branković strongly opposed Uniatism and did not send his delegates to the Council of Florence in 1439, when the short-lived "Union" between the Byzantine Emperor and the Pope was concluded. That year, much of the Serbian Despotate, including the capital city of Smederevo fell for the first time to the Ottomans, but after a couple of years of occupation restored freedom and independence in 1444. Soon after that, metropolitan Nicodim was chosen for the Serbian Patriarch in 1445. He chirotonized the Moldavian metropolitan Teoktist, instead of the old Joakim who supported Uniatism. In 1452, Nikodim II gifted the manuscript book Margarit of John Chrysostom, which is today held in the Monastery of the Holy Trinity of Pljevlja. Nikodim II was the penultimate Serbian Patriarch before the fall of the Serbian Despotate under the Ottomans, who conquered Christian Constantinople in 1453.

See also
List of heads of the Serbian Orthodox Church

References

Sources
 
 
 

15th-century Serbian people
Patriarchs of the Serbian Orthodox Church
People of the Serbian Despotate
15th-century Eastern Orthodox archbishops
Medieval Serbian Orthodox bishops
15th-century deaths
Year of birth unknown